Izunna Arnest Uzochukwu (born 11 April 1990) is a Nigerian professionall footballer who plays for Denmark Series club B1909.

Career

Club
During the summer of 2013, Uzochukwu was subject to a transfer bid from Valenciennes, but the deal fell through.

In July 2015, Uzochukwu signed a three-year contract with Russian Premier League side Amkar Perm.

He returned to Denmark in January 2016 to play for OB. He left the club by mutual termination on 2 January 2018.

Uzochukw joined China League One side Meizhou Hakka on 29 January 2018.

At the end of March 2022, Uzochukwu joined Danish amateur club B1909. In January 2023, the club confirmed that Uzochukwu would serve as a playing assistant coach going forward.

International
Uzochukwu was called up to the Nigeria national team for the first time in September 2015, making his debut against Tanzania on 5 September.

Career statistics

Club

International

Statistics accurate as of match played 5 September 2015

Honours

Club
Midtjylland
Danish Superliga (1): 2014–15

References

External links

 

1990 births
Living people
Nigerian footballers
Nigeria international footballers
Association football midfielders
F.C. Ebedei players
FC Midtjylland players
FC Amkar Perm players
Odense Boldklub players
Meizhou Hakka F.C. players
Aalesunds FK players
FC Honka players
Danish Superliga players
Russian Premier League players
China League One players
Norwegian First Division players
Eliteserien players
Veikkausliiga players
Nigerian expatriate footballers
Expatriate men's footballers in Denmark
Nigerian expatriate sportspeople in Denmark
Expatriate footballers in Russia
Nigerian expatriate sportspeople in Russia
Expatriate footballers in China
Nigerian expatriate sportspeople in China
Expatriate footballers in Norway
Nigerian expatriate sportspeople in Norway
Expatriate footballers in Finland
Nigerian expatriate sportspeople in Finland